Genyochromis mento is a species of haplochromine cichlid endemic to Lake Malawi in East Africa.  It is also found in the aquarium trade.  It is well known for biting the fins of other fish and is a scale-eater.  It reaches a length of  TL.  It is currently the only known member of its genus.

References

Haplochromini
Fish of Lake Malawi

Fish described in 1935
Taxa named by Ethelwynn Trewavas
Taxonomy articles created by Polbot